Marie Picasso (born Lilly Marie Pettersson on 24 April 1979) is a Swedish singer, host and model who first rose to fame as a housemate on the popular reality television show Big Brother, before going on to win the fourth series of the Swedish singing competition Idol.

Biography

Big Brother
In 2002, Picasso appeared as a housemate on the hugely popular reality television show Big Brother. During the show, she caused widespread controversy when she had sex on-camera with another housemate, Benjamin Sorani, who had become her boyfriend. After leaving the house, she went on to host several game shows on TV4, and also released a single titled Tell The World in Germany, which was used to promote a local soap opera.

Idol 2007
In the summer of 2007, Picasso auditioned for the fourth series of popular Swedish singing competition Idol in Stockholm, singing "Beautiful" by Christina Aguilera. The three judges were impressed by her emotion-filled voice and she passed through to the next stage of the contest with a unanimous "yes" vote. Several weeks later, Picasso made it into the top 11 contestants, and her powerful voice continued to wow the judges and the public. Despite landing in the bottom 3 twice, Picasso made it through to the finale at the Globen Arena, and on 7 December, she was crowned as the fourth Swedish Idol, defeating runner-up Amanda Jenssen by a margin of only 2%. TV4 received some criticism for including Picasso in the series as she had worked for TV4 as a presenter and also had a professional singing career before entering Idol.

Idol Performances
Stockholm Auditions: "Beautiful" by Christina Aguilera
Top 16 "I Can't Make You Love Me" by Mike Reid and Allen Shamblin
Top 14 "The Power of Love" by Jennifer Rush
Top 11 1-Hit Wonders: "Baby Love" by Mother's Finest
Top 10 Movie Themes: "Flashdance...What a Feeling" by Irene Cara
Top 9 Hitlist: "Big Girls Don't Cry" by Fergie - Bottom 3
Top 8 Blood, Sweat and Tears: "I'll Be There" by The Jackson 5
Top 7 Dedicated To...: "Always on My Mind" by Willie Nelson
Top 6 Disco: "Ain't Nobody" by Chaka Khan
Top 5 Gospel: "How Will I Know" by Whitney Houston - Bottom 3
Top 4 Rock: "Weak" by Skunk Anansie
Top 4 Rock: "You Oughta Know" by Alanis Morissette
Top 3 Judge's Choice: "I Have Nothing" by Whitney Houston
Top 3 Judge's Choice: "Maneater" by Nelly Furtado
Top 2 Grand Finale: "All By Myself" by Eric Carmen
Top 2 Grand Finale: "I'll Be There" by The Jackson 5
Top 2 Grand Finale: "This Moment" by Marie Picasso - Declared 4th Swedish Idol

Post-Idol Career

2007–2008: The Secret
Immediately after winning Idol, Picasso signed a recording contract with Sony BMG and her debut single, This Moment was released. A week later, the song debuted at number one on the Swedish singles chart, and after holding the top spot for two weeks, the single was certified double platinum for the sale of 40,000 copies. Her debut album, The Secret was quickly recording and released on 19 December, only weeks after her victory. Like its lead single, The Secret also debuted at number one. After only one week on the chart, Picasso's album was certified gold for the sale of almost 30,000 copies. The album went on to hold the top spot for three consecutive weeks, longer than any other Idol winner.

In early January 2008, Picasso announced her first national tour titled The Secret Tour to support her debut album. The tour commenced on 25 January in Vasteras and ended on 5 April in Örebro, with Picasso performing a total of 23 sold-out shows across Sweden. In March 2008, The Secret was certified platinum, having sold just over 60,000 copies since its release. As the supportive tour neared its end, Picasso released "Winning Streak", the second single to be taken from her debut album. However, the song failed to gain popularity and as a result did not sell enough copies to reach the official top 60 of the Swedish singles chart. The single's failure to chart was all the more surprising because Picasso had previously attained multi-platinum sales from her first single and debut album, and only recently completed a hugely successful, sell-out tour.

2008–present: Record Rumours and Second Album
Throughout the early summer of 2008, Picasso continued to promote her debut album with appearances on both Swedish television and summer festivals, performing a variety of tracks from the album. Toward the end of the summer, rumours began to circulate that Sony BMG were planning to release Picasso from her record contract. The failure of her second single was cited as one of the reasons, as was the apparently greater success of Amanda Jenssen, whom Picasso has defeated in the finale of Idol.

During an interview in September 2008, Sony BMG marketing manager Magnus Klint stated that the label were, "in discussions with Picasso" about her future with the label and although they hoped to co-operate with her, nothing was set.
She also made an appearance on I Survived a Japanese Game Show in 2009.

Picasso was announced as a songwriter for the song "Alive" to be performed by singer Jasmine Abela in the Maltese national selection for the Eurovision Song Contest 2016.

Discography

The following is a complete discography of every album and single released by Swedish pop and pop-rock singer Marie Picasso.

Albums

Singles

Other Charted Songs

Tours
2008: The Secret Tour

Sources
TV4s idol page- Retrieved from Tv4 homepage
Marie Picasso tittarnas favorit - retrieved from aftonbladet

References

External links
Official website

1979 births
Living people
Big Brother (franchise) contestants
Idol (Swedish TV series) winners
Swedish television hosts
21st-century Swedish singers
21st-century Swedish women singers
Swedish women television presenters